Hanchuan is a county-level city in east-central Hubei province, People's Republic of China. It is under the administration of Xiaogan prefecture-level city.

The city's urban area is located on the left bank of the Han River a few tens of kilometres upstream from Wuhan. However, the county-level city as an administrative unit also includes some land on the right bank of the river as well.

Transport
The city has been served by the Hanchuan railway station on the Wuhan–Yichang railway.

Sister city
Hanchuan is a sister city of Martinez, California, United States.

Administrative divisions

Two subdistricts:
 Xiannüshan Subdistrict and Diaodong Subdistrict

Fourteen towns:
Makou, Maiwang, Chenghuang, Fenshui, Chenhu, Tian'erhe, Huilong, Xinyan, Tongzhong (/), Mahe, Liujiage, Xinhe, Miaotou, Yanglingou

Six townships:
Xijiang Township, Wantan Township, Nanhe Township, Ma'an Township, Litan Township, Hanji Township

Five other areas:
Hanchuan Economic and Technological Development Zone, Diaocha Lake Breeding Farm, Huayan Farm, Sanxingyuan Farm, Zhongzhou Farm

Climate

References 

County-level divisions of Hubei
Wuhan urban agglomeration
Xiaogan